The Pajon River is a river in the United States territory of Guam.

See also
List of rivers of Guam

References
USGS Geographic Names Information Service

Rivers of Guam